Alcohol (Raksi or Madira) is Legal to produce 60 Litres of fermented beverage and distill 30 Litres Raksi per year for personal consumption, but it's illegal to sell home made Spirits Raksi in Nepal. The mixed society coupled with caste and multiple ethnic results in extremely complex social structure, generally alcohol consumption depends upon individual social background. There are mainly two types of people in Nepal depending upon alcohol uses. The group of people who do not drink or use alcohol are called Tagadhari (Holy Cord (Janai) Wearer), and the other group who drink alcohol are called Matawali. Generally, the Brahmins and Kshatriyas are the Janai wearer and do not drink alcohol, but with the exception of Matwali Chhetries of Karnali who are permitted to use alcohol. Alcohol also plays an important role in rituals, festivals and religious ceremonies. Matwali uses alcohol for their traditional purposes and generally brew alcohol by themselves. People such as Tharu, Kirati people, Magar, Gurung, Tamang, Newars

Traditionally, in the group of Matwali, males are allowed to drink freely while women are somewhat restricted to use alcohol.

History

In Hindu culture, alcohol is often described as Soma. In the epic of Ramayana and Mahabharata, there are mentions of drinking alcohol by god and goddesses as a recreational food. In ancient and medieval Nepal, the Kirats, Shakyas, Lichhavis, etc. had already made a trade relationship with Tibet, India, and China from where drinking culture probably entered Nepal. The Lele inscription of Shivadev I and Amshuverma dated 526 AD mentioned alcohol as Paniyagosthi. In the inscription of Jayalambha dated 413AD, the word Karanapuja is used referring to the alcohol; the inscription was found near Pashupatinath Temple.

The Christian Father Ippolito Desideri, who travelled Nepal about 1720, had a written account of a pungent-smelling liquor made from millet. He also mentions arac, a drink made from wheat or rice.

In modern Nepal, the Maluki Aain of 1854 categorically classified Nepalese society into five categories. One of them was the Tagadhari who were not allowed to drink, while the remaining four were allowed to drink. In the modern constitution, however, there is no such distinction and everyone is equally allowed to use alcohol-based on their personal preference.

Tradition and religion
Alcohol is used for various rituals by various indegeneious communities especially the one influenced by Tantric methods. Some are described below.

Sherpas
Sherpas use alcohol in marriage and festivals extensively. It is also given to the new mothers as Dejyang. When used as a business settlement, it is called Chhongjyang.

Newars

Ha Thon is a festival to worship Swyeta Bhairab in which the Samayabji and Aila is distributed as the blessing of Bhairab. Alcohol also forms a part of Sagan.
In gathering and festival (Bhoj), liquor is generally served by a female.

Tharus
During the marriage, alcohol is offered to deities called Deuryar. In the hair cutting ritual celebrated in Falgun (February -March), alcohol is offered to deities to accept the ritual's starting. Drinking and dancing are one of the core cultures of Tharus.

Kirat
In the kirati community, a marriage proposal is not accepted by the girl’s family unless the groom sends them alcohol on three occasions as Sodhani, Multheki and  Bhakah. Kirati also use alcohol for various rituals and to worship gods and goddesses.

Tamang
Groom needs to send 18 or 12 bottles of liquor to bride's house for marriage known as Chukunlah Pong. When someone dies, alcohol is offered to the deceased. The daughter brings alcohol to serve the funeral participants.

Magar
Couples are not allowed to go to the bride's home after marriage without taking wine and a leg of goat. This is called Duran.

Gurung
Similar to kirati culture, Gurung family's marriage initiation also starts by sending alcohol to the bride's family by the groom. They also use alcohol as an offering to the deceased person.

Types of alcohol
 Aila: It is a distilled alcohol. The term Aila is used by Newars, Madh by Tharus and Daru in southern Nepal.  
 Raksi: Raksi is a general term to refer to traditionally distilled alcohol. 
 Tongba:  It is the traditional and indigenous drink of the Limbu people as well as people of other Kirati communities and many other ethnic group of Nepal.  . It is home-brewed fermented beer that is drunk by mixing with hot water. It is native to eastern Nepal.
 Chhaang: It is a sweet-tasting, home-brewed beer by Sherpas. It is also known as Ji by Tamangs, Thon by Newars, Phee by Thakalis, Jand by Gurngs and kiratis, Muna by Majhis and Janra by Tharus.
Tin Pani: It means 3 times water in Nepali. It is traditional distilled alcohol prepared by changing the condencing water for only 3 times .
 Arac: A drink made from wheat or rice, used in Medieval Nepal.
 Thon: A term used by Newars for a fermented drink
 Jaad: traditional, home-brewed beer
 Nigar: Same as Jaad, terms used in eastern Nepal
Mada: Distilled Spirits in the hilly and Himali region of Eastern Rukum

Traditional Breweing

Beer
A typical traditional beer brewing technique in Nepal consist of following steps:
The grain is wetted for few hours and then kept in a large earthen pot with holes in bottom (Ghyampo)
It is then transferred to copper vessel (Potasi) and boiled in hot water for about two hours
After boiling, it is cooled and a piece of charcoal(hyangva) and chilly (Malta)) is kept over the grain to protect it from evil
 Yeast (Marcha) is added (about the ratio of 1:80) and let the grain for fermentation
 after a week, the mix is put in an earthen pot (Tyapa) and covered with leaves in the top and sealed. At this point, the grain is called Haja or Ium
Water is poured after about four days in the process called La Tayagu
After about six hours, liquid changes to beer

Consumption
Tamang uses 80kg and 400 kg by Tharus.

Industries
Alcohol industry is one of the fastest-growing industry in Nepal.  There are 36 alcohol producing industries in Nepal as of 2000. These industries produces alcohol with concentration of 20%, 34%, 40% and 42.8%. Similarly,  beers are produced with a concentration of 5 to 7% alcohol.  The total production capacity is about 42 M liters per year. Besides, alcohol is also imported from Europe, America and Japan.

Regulation
Production and consumption of alcohol is controlled by the Madira Aain 2031. Licence is required to sell alcohol. However, it permits brewing and consumption for household purposes without a license.

In 2017, a regulation was passed to set minimum age of 21 for alcohol purchase, regulate time of alcohol sales, require licensing of alcohol outlets and impose a ban on all kinds of alcohol advertisements and promotions. It also includes pictorial warning signs in the label of alcohol.

References

Alcohol in Nepal